The American School of Paris (ASP), established in 1946, is a coeducational, independent international school in Saint-Cloud, France, in the Paris metropolitan area.

The school has over 800 students from pre-kindergarten to Grade 12 and post-Bac. Located on a private 10.5 acre (40,000+ m2) campus on the edge of Paris, ASP provides an American education to an international student body of more than 50 nationalities.

School overview
ASP is organized into three divisions: Lower School (Early Childhood through Grade 5, or 3–10 years old), Middle School (Grades 6-8, or ages 11–13) and Upper School (Grades 9-12 and post-Bac, or 14–18 years old). Approximately one-third of the students are American, and 17% are French. The other half of the students come from over 50 countries.

Approximately 75% of students are expatriates with parents serving diplomatic or corporate posts in the Paris region. ASP offers a transportable education, thus students are able to transition from and to schools in the United States and elsewhere with little disruption.

Class sizes are small, and except for foreign language courses, are delivered in English. ASP accepts students who do not speak English up to the age of 8 and has extensive support programs for English as an Additional Language (EAL) learning for those students,  as well as other support services for students from age 3 to Grade 12. ASP graduates matriculate at colleges and universities in the USA and around the world.

References

External links
American School of Paris

American international schools in France
Schools in Hauts-de-Seine
Lycées in Hauts-de-Seine
Educational institutions established in 1946
1946 establishments in France
International schools in Île-de-France
International Baccalaureate schools in France